The Motorola Razr3 (often stylized as RAZR3) is a cancelled series of clamshell/flip mobile phones from Motorola, as the successor to the popular RAZR (and RAZR2) series.

The Razr3 consisted of one prototype model, the VE1. Due to the bankruptcy of UIQ Technology and Motorola's subsequent move to Android in 2009, the Razr3's worldwide release was cancelled. However, the phone was released in South Korea by SK Telecom in late 2009 as model V13, featuring CDMA instead of GSM/HSDPA. The Razr3 featured the Symbian smartphone operating system with the UIQ interface, an external touchscreen, and a 5.0 megapixel camera with an LED flash.

V13

The RAZR3 V13 was released by carrier SK Telecom on November 6, 2009 exclusively to South Korea. It has 303 MB on board memory, an external touchscreen, EVDO speeds and a 5.0 megapixel camera with auto focus and LED flash.

References

RAZR3
Mobile phones introduced in 2009
Symbian devices